Blaise Musipère (born 15 May 1986 in Kinshasa) is a Congolese actor and former basketball player.

Forced to leave his country as a consequence of the civil war, he arrived in Brazil, where he survived working in various jobs until he was finally able to start an acting career.

Career

Television 
2013: Malhação
2019: Órfãos da Terra as Jean-Baptiste, a Haitian refugee

Film 
2011: Memórias do Meu Tio as a gangster
2012: Pra ser feliz as Raúl

References

External links 
 

1986 births
Living people
People from Kinshasa
Democratic Republic of the Congo expatriates in Brazil
Democratic Republic of the Congo male actors
Brazilian male telenovela actors